Boulay-les-Ifs is a commune in the Mayenne department in northwestern France.

Population

See also
Communes of Mayenne
Parc naturel régional Normandie-Maine

References

Communes of Mayenne